The 2017 World Archery Youth Championships was the 15th edition of World Youth Archery Championships. The event was held in Rosario, Argentina 2-8 October 2017, and was organised by World Archery. Junior events were held for those under 20, and Cadet for those under 17.

Medal summary

Junior

Recurve

Compound

Cadet

Recurve

Compound

Medal table

References

2017
International archery competitions hosted by Argentina
Sport in Rosario, Santa Fe
World Championship
World Archery
World Archery
World Archery Youth Championships